Second master was a rating introduced into the Royal Navy in 1753 that indicated a deputy master on third-rate ships of the line or larger.

Second masters were paid significantly more than master's mates, £5 5s per month. A second master was generally a master's mate who had passed his examination for master and was deemed worthy of being master of a vessel. Second masters were given the first opportunity for master vacancies as they occurred.

Master's mates also acted as second master of vessels too small to be allocated a warranted master.

Footnotes

Military ranks of the Royal Navy